Urban Blues is a live album by violinist and composer Leroy Jenkins. It was recorded in January 1984 at Sweet Basil in New York City, and was released by Black Saint later that year. On the album, Jenkins is joined by members of his band Sting: Terry Jenoure on violin and vocals, Brandon Ross and James Emery on guitar, Alonzo Gardner on bass, and Kamal Sabir on drums.

Reception

In a review for AllMusic, Ron Wynn wrote: "Violinist Leroy Jenkins was at the helm of Sting, which played funky and free, did originals and vintage spirituals, and would shift from stretches of collective improvisation to challenging solo exchanges. They were a unique, intriguing group, but sadly didn't last. This 1984 album... presented them at their best, displaying the breadth of influences, genres, sources and styles that converged and resulted in the work of a great band. "

The authors of the Penguin Guide to Jazz Recordings commented: "Jenkins's working band Sting were capable of great things in a live setting, an impact not unlike that of Ornette Coleman's Prime Time. The instrumentation is strongly reminiscent... but Jenkins redeploys the harmonic and rhythmic emphases differently. Where Prime Time can be bludgeoningly illogical, Sting can sound, as here, perversely rational."

Track listing
All compositions by Leroy Jenkins.

 "Static in the Attic" – 6:25
 "Looking for the Blues" – 9:50
 "Come on Home, Baby" – 2:25
 "Why Can't I Fly?" – 5:31
 "O.W. Fredrick" – 7:15
 "No Banks River" – 4:00
 "Through the Ages, Jehovah" – 2:53

Personnel 
 Leroy Jenkins – violin
 Terry Jenoure – violin, vocals
 Brandon Ross – guitar
 James Emery – guitar
 Alonzo Gardner – bass
 Kamal Sabir – drums

References

1984 live albums
Leroy Jenkins (jazz musician) live albums
Black Saint/Soul Note live albums